is a Japanese four-panel manga series written and illustrated by Saxyun. The series revolves around four university students living together in a cheap apartment building. It has been adapted into two OVAs and an anime series that premiered April 2012 under the name Yurumates 3D.

The first volume of manga sold 100,000 copies in Japan.

Characters

References

External links
 Official first OVA site 
 Official second OVA site 
 Official TV anime site 
 

2005 manga
2009 anime OVAs
2011 anime OVAs
2012 anime television series debuts
2012 Japanese television series endings
Anime series based on manga
C2C (studio)
Comedy anime and manga
Kadokawa Dwango franchises
Takeshobo manga
Yonkoma